Acrodermatitis chronica atrophicans (ACA)  is a skin rash indicative of the third or late stage of European Lyme borreliosis.

ACA is a dermatological condition that takes a chronically progressive course and finally leads to a widespread atrophy of the skin. Involvement of the peripheral nervous system is often observed, specifically polyneuropathy.

This progressive skin process is due to the effect of continuing active infection with the spirochete Borrelia afzelii, which is the predominant pathophysiology. B. afzelii may not be the exclusive etiologic agent of ACA; Borrelia garinii has also been detected.

Presentation
The rash caused by ACA is most evident on the extremities. It begins with an inflammatory stage with bluish red discoloration and cutaneous swelling, and concludes several months or years later with an atrophic phase. Sclerotic skin plaques may also develop. As ACA progresses the skin begins to wrinkle (atrophy).

Cause

Diagnosis
Generally a two-step approach is followed. First, a screening test involving IgM and IgG ELISA. If the ELISA screening has a positive or equivocal result, then the second step is to perform a Western Blot as a confirmatory test.

Other methods include microscopy and culture (in modified Kelly's medium) of skin biopsy or blood samples.

Treatment
Antibiotics is recommended in treatment of ACA. Doxycycline is often used. Resolution may take several months. Skin damage and nerve damage may persist after treatment.

History
The first record of ACA was made in 1883 in Breslau, Germany, where a physician named Alfred Buchwald first delineated it.Herxheimer and Hartmann described it in 1902 as a "tissue paper like" cutaneous atrophy.

See also
 Erythema migrans
 List of cutaneous conditions
 Lyme disease

References

Bibliography 
 Stanek G &  Strle F (2008) Lyme Disease—European Perspective| Infectious Disease Clinics of North America | Volume 22 | Issue 2 | June 2008, Pages 327-339|Abstract

External links 

Abnormalities of dermal fibrous and elastic tissue
Lyme disease
Spirochaetes
Bacterium-related cutaneous conditions